Thenkasi Pattanam is a 2002 Indian Tamil-language comedy film directed by Rafi Mecartin and produced by S. S. Durairaju. The film stars Sarath Kumar and Napoleon as the male leads while Samyuktha Varma, Devayani, and Aswathi Menon play the female leads. This film is the Tamil remake of the Malayalam movie Thenkasipattanam (2000). The music was composed by Suresh Peters, while the editing was done by Harihara Puthran. The film was released on 21 June 2002. It was one of the year's Tamil blockbusters.

Synopsis
Kannan and Dass are owners of the market in Tenkasi. They become the famous rowdies under the guidance of their godfather. Dass has a sister called Uma who is the educated girl and wants to get rid of their rudeness from their behaviour. Manikkam pillai (shortened as Mapillai) who later joined as the manager of the KD & Co who is regularly beaten by them due to his stupidity. Soon later it is revealed that Mapillai is in love with their sister, but she is not interested in him. He joins Kannan's and Dass's firm KD & Company as the manager in an attempt to win Uma's love and her brothers. To make her (Uma) happy, Mapillai decides to find the brides for Dass and Kannan. KD & Co once keeps as hostage a music troupe who comes to their village to perform. The main singer of that troupe, Sangeetha, gets expelled from her home because of this, so Kannan and Dass gives her refuge upon Uma's insistence. Mapillai plans to unite  Dass and Sangeetha. Meenakshi is the childhood friend of Kannan, who is their enemy's daughter. Meenakshi tries to prove her love and Kannan does not reciprocate it. Soon, Kannan asks Dass for the marriage with Meenakshi for him, but Dass mistakenly understands Meenakshi as his bride. On the other hand, Sangeetha is in love with Kannan after some fights, Dass and Kannan bring Meenakshi to their home, and starts wedding preparation. Soon Mapillai realises his mistake and wants to change the brides to their respective grooms. When the truth is revealed, Dass who is madly in love with Meenakshi, forces her in a marriage with him, Kannan who is badly beaten by Dass who is ready to give up his love for his friendship. Dass changes his mind, allows Kannan and Meenakshi to unite. Sangeetha is to marry Dass. Finally, both Dass and Kannan allow Mapillai to marry Uma.

Cast

 Sharath Kumar as Kannan
 Napoleon as Dass
 Vivek as Manikkam Pillai (Mapillai)
 Samyuktha Varma as Meenakshi
 Devayani as Sangeetha
 Aswathi Menon as Uma
 P. Vasu as Devaraj
 Charle as S.K.Velu
 Biyon as Young Kannan
 Vinu Chakravarthy as Rasappan
 Srividya as Devaki 
 Kovai Sarala as Kamala
 Delhi Ganesh as Parthasarathi
 Pandu as Kothandam 
 Thyagu as Thangarasu
 Mayilsamy as Raja 
 Kumarimuthu as Kumaresan
 Besant Ravi
 Bonda Mani
 Dimple Rose
 Kovai Senthil

Production
The film was a remake of Malayalam film of same name, and Manoj Kumar was signed on to direct its Tamil version. Vijayakanth was initially cast in a lead role, before he and the director both backed out. Rafi-Mecartin, who handled the original, was later approached to direct the Tamil version. Sarathkumar and Napoleon was chosen to portray lead roles. Samyuktha Verma made her debut in Tamil with this film reprising her role from original.

The film's shooting took place in and around the outskirts of Palakkad, Quilon, Thenkasi, Ambasamudram, Udumalaipettai, Coimbatore, Tirunelveli and Pollachi cities.

Soundtrack
All the songs were composed by Suresh Peters retaining all the tunes from original. This was Suresh Peter's second film in Tamil as composer and second collaboration with Sarathkumar after Coolie (1995).

Reception
Chennai Online wrote "The film is meant to be a laugh riot, but the laughs are hard to come by." The Hindu wrote "Thenkasi Pattanam" is a colourful mela ... action-filled and humorous."

References

2002 films
Tamil remakes of Malayalam films
2000s Tamil-language films
Films scored by Suresh Peters
Indian comedy films
2002 comedy films
Films directed by Rafi–Mecartin